Baykalsk is a town in Slyudyansky District of Irkutsk Oblast, Russia, located  from Slyudyanka, the administrative center of the district. Population:

History
Baykalsk was founded in 1961 concomitant with the building of a paper mill there, called Baykalsk Paper and Pulp Mills. In 1966 the mill became operational, and the settlement received "city" status. At its peak, the mill employed about 3,500 people.

In the late 2000s, Baykalsk faced a series of well-documented economic crises stemming from its status as a monotown entirely dependent on the declining and then closed paper mill.

Administrative and municipal status
Within the framework of administrative divisions, Baykalsk is subordinated to Slyudyansky District. As a municipal division, the town of Baykalsk, together with two rural localities in Slyudyansky District, is incorporated within Slyudyansky Municipal District as Baykalskoye Urban Settlement.

Economy

Baykalsk Paper and Pulp Mills was a major source of pollution of Lake Baikal. About 3,500 people were directly employed by the plant. The plant was closed in 2009 after new expensive waste water treatment equipment made the factory unprofitable after the global economic downturn. In Soviet times, the factory management was primarily responsible for the town's maintenance. The town and plant administrations were independent from one another but 95% of the town's budget used to come from the plant in the form of taxes. In January 2010, following disturbances, the Russian government with the cooperation of its private owner reopened the factory and exempted it from pollution rules but lowered the workers' wages.
In September 2013, the mill underwent a final bankruptcy, with the last eight hundred workers slated to lose their jobs by December 28, 2013.

Infrastructure
There are nine kindergartens, three theaters, and a new sports center in the town. The residential parts mostly consist of three- and five-story apartment blocks due to high risk of an earthquake in the town.

Sister cities
South Lake Tahoe (California, USA)

References

Notes

Sources

Registry of the Administrative-Territorial Formations of Irkutsk Oblast

External links
Official website of Baykalsk 
Directory of organizations in Baykalsk 

Cities and towns in Irkutsk Oblast
Populated places established in 1961
Cities and towns built in the Soviet Union
Monotowns in Russia
Populated places on Lake Baikal